Whitecross is the eponymous debut album from the Christian metal band Whitecross, released on September 5, 1987. It reached No. 17 on Billboard's Top Contemporary Christian Albums chart. In 2010, HM Magazine listed Whitecross No. 29 on its Top 100 Christian Rock Albums of All Time list stating that "listen to this album. It'll blow your mind. It's simplistic '80s metal to a fault (think Ratt with Jesus-first lyrics), but the shredding lead guitar by Rex Carroll in every fill, nook and cranny is primo." Heaven's Metal fanzine ranked it No. 4 on its Top 100 Christian metal albums of all-time list.

Track listing
"Who Will You Follow" (4:02)
"Enough Is Enough" (5:44)
"He Is the Rock" (4:34)
"Lookin' for a Reason" (3:33)
"You're Mine" (4:03)
"No Way I'm Goin' Down" (4:12)
"Seein' Is Believin'" (4:28)
"All I Need" (4:13)
"Nagasake" (1:53)
"Signs of the End" (4:00)

Band members
Scott Wenzel - Vocals
Rex Carroll - Guitars
Mark Hedl - Drums
Jon Sproule - Bass

References

1987 debut albums
Whitecross albums